The 1933–34 Challenge Cup was the 34th staging of rugby league's oldest knockout competition, the Challenge Cup during the 1933–34 season.

First round

Second round

Quarterfinals

Semifinals

Final
Hunslet defeated Widnes 11-5 in the final at Wembley before a crowd of 41,280.

This was Hunslet’s second Cup final win, the first being in 1907–08, in their third Cup final appearance.

References

Challenge Cup
Challenge Cup